A Automobile Company was a brass era American automobile manufacturer located in Sacramento, California from 1910 to 1913. It sold a car known as the Blue & Gold.

History 
Tha A Automobile Company was founded in Sacramento, California, in September 1910 by San Francisco businessmen E. C. Collins (president), J. H. Graham (vice president), T. F. Cooke (treasurer), and C. E. Gibbs (secretary). They planned a factory with a capacity of 5000 cars, built on land given to the company by North Sacramento Land Company.

Offices were set up in Sacramento in January 1911.

Their first product was to be a torpedo-bodied runabout, named the Blue & Gold, after the colors of California's state flag.

By 1913, a small number of cars had been built, with four- or six-cylinder engine, electric lights, self-starting, and left-hand drive. The four, on a  wheelbase, was priced at US$1150, with sliding-gear three-speed transmission. The six sold for $2100.

Though production in 1913 was projected to be 500, as few as 29 were actually built.

Notes 

Brass Era vehicles
Defunct motor vehicle manufacturers of the United States
Motor vehicle manufacturers based in California
Defunct manufacturing companies based in California
Sacramento, California
Cars introduced in 1910
1913 disestablishments
1910 establishments in California